Evelīna Freidenfelde (born 3 March 2004) is a Latvian footballer who plays as a midfielder for Liepājas and the Latvia national team.

International career
Freidenfelde made her debut for the Latvia national team on 17 September 2021, coming on as a substitute for Viktorija Zaičikova against Austria.

References

2004 births
Living people
Women's association football midfielders
Latvian women's footballers
Latvia women's international footballers